Christopher Crummey (born 1993) is an Irish hurler who plays for Dublin Senior Championship club Lucan Sarsfields and at inter-county level with the Dublin senior hurling team. He currently lines out as a wing-forward having previously lined out at wing-back.

Career

A member of the Lucan Sarsfields club, Crummey first came to prominence on the inter-county scene as captain of the Dublin minor team that won the 2011 Leinster Championship. He subsequently lined out with the Dublin under-21 team as well as with DCU Dóchas Éireann in the Fitzgibbon Cup. Crummey was just out of the minor grade when he was added to the Dublin senior hurling team, making his debut during the 2013 Walsh Cup. He was a member of the extended panel that won the 2013 Leinster Championship.

Career statistics

Honours

Dublin 
Leinster Senior Hurling Championship: 2013
Walsh Cup: 2013, 2016
Leinster Minor Hurling Championship: 2011 (c)

References

External links
Chris Crummey profile at the Dublin GAA website

1993 births
Living people
Dublin inter-county hurlers
Irish schoolteachers
Lucan Sarsfields hurlers